The sixth and penultimate season of the American television drama series Sons of Anarchy premiered on September 10, 2013, and concluded on December 10, 2013, after 13 episodes aired on cable network FX. Created by Kurt Sutter, it is about the lives of a close-knit outlaw motorcycle club operating in Charming, a fictional town in California's Central Valley. The show centers on protagonist Jackson "Jax" Teller (Charlie Hunnam), the president of the club, who begins questioning the club and himself.

The season finale was the second-most watched episode of the season and the most-watched finale in the series history.

Sons of Anarchy is the story of the Teller-Morrow family of Charming, California, as well as other members of the Sons of Anarchy Motorcycle Club, Redwood Original (SAMCRO), their families, various Charming townspeople, allied and rival gangs, associates, and law agencies that undermine or support SAMCRO's legal and illegal enterprises.

Plot
Following the arrest of Tara and Clay, Jax struggles to hold SAMCRO together while Tara is imprisoned. Toric approaches both Tara and Clay and offers them deals in exchange for giving up SAMCRO; both initially refuse, but Clay later relents when confronted with being thrown into the prison's general population and assuredly being killed by inmates paid off by Damon Pope's men as a retaliation for Pope's murder. Juice returns to Charming after helping Bobby relocate after stepping down as VP, which angers Chibs, who doesn't believe Juice has been punished enough for talking to cops and later beats him.

Cast and characters

Sons of Anarchy is the story of the Teller-Morrow family of Charming, California, as well as the other members of Sons of Anarchy Motorcycle Club, Redwood Original (SAMCRO), their families, various Charming townspeople, allied and rival gangs, associates, and law agencies that undermine or support SAMCRO's legal and illegal enterprises.

Main cast
 Charlie Hunnam as Jackson "Jax" Teller 
 Katey Sagal as Gemma Teller Morrow 
 Mark Boone Junior as Robert "Bobby Elvis" Munson 
 Dayton Callie as Wayne Unser 
 Kim Coates as Alex "Tig" Trager 
 Tommy Flanagan as Filip "Chibs" Telford
 Theo Rossi as Juan-Carlos "Juice" Ortiz 
 Maggie Siff as Tara Knowles-Teller 
 Ron Perlman as Clarence "Clay" Morrow 
 Jimmy Smits as Nero Padilla

Special guest cast 
 CCH Pounder as Tyne Patterson 
 Drea de Matteo as Wendy Case 
 Rockmond Dunbar as Lieutenant Eli Roosevelt 
 Peter Weller as Charles Barosky 
 Donal Logue as Lee Toric 
 Walton Goggins as Venus Van Dam 
 Mitch Pileggi as Ernest Darby 
 Robert Patrick as Les Packer

Recurring cast 
 David LaBrava as Happy Lowman 
 Niko Nicotera as George "Ratboy" Skogstrom
 Michael Marisi Ornstein as Chuck Marstein 
 Robin Weigert as Ally Lowen
 LaMonicca Garret as Sgt. Cane 
 Timothy V. Murphy as Gallen O'Shay 
 Reynaldo Gallegos as Fiasco 
 Kim Dickens as Collette Jane
 Billy Brown as August Marks 
 Douglas Bennett as Orlin West 
 Rusty Coones as Rane Quinn 
 McNally Sagal as Margaret Murphy 
 Winter Ave Zoli as Lyla Winston 
 Jacob Vargas as Alessandro Montez 
 Christopher Douglas Reed as Phillip "Filthy Phil" Russell 
 Steve Howey as Hopper 
 Kurt Sutter as "Big" Otto Delaney 
 Bob McCracken as Brendan Roarke 
 Kenneth Choi as Henry Lin 
 Emilio Rivera as Marcus Alvarez 
 Kristen Renton as Ima 
 Walter Wong as Chris "V-Lin" Von Lin 
 Jeff Kober as Jacob Hale, Jr.
 Alan O'Neill as Hugh

Guest stars 
 Samaire Armstrong as Darvany Jennings 
 Keone Young as Bohai Lin 
 Hayley McFarland as Brooke Putner 
 Olivia Burnette as Homeless Woman 
 Mo McRae as Tyler Yost 
 C. Thomas Howell as Frank Eagan 
 Dave Navarro as Arcadio Nerona 
 Doug Jones as Officer Crane
 Michael Shamus Wiles as Jury White 
 Adrienne Barbeau as Alice Nona 
 Patrick St. Esprit as Elliott Oswald

Production
Although Sons of Anarchy is set in Northern California's Central Valley, it is filmed primarily at Occidental Studios Stage 5A in North Hollywood. Main sets located there include the clubhouse, St. Thomas Hospital and Jax's house. The production rooms at the studio used by the writing staff also double as the Charming police station. External scenes are often filmed nearby in Sun Valley and Tujunga.

Episodes

Reception
Season six has received generally favorable reviews. At Metacritic, the season received a critic score of 74% based on 9 critic reviews. On review aggregator website Rotten Tomatoes, it has an approval rating of 76% based on 25 reviews. The site's critical consensus reads: "Sons of Anarchy continues to deliver an energetic blend of bracing action sequences, pitch black humor, and heartless violence."  At IGN, season 6 episodes received critic ratings ranging from a low of 8.1 (Episode 604, labelled "Great" and "Editors' Choice") to a high of 9.5 (Episode 611, labelled "Amazing", and "Editors' Choice").

Home media release
The sixth season was released in the United States on DVD and Blu-ray on August 26, 2014.

References

External links
 
 

 
2013 American television seasons